The Royal Air Forces Association (also called the RAF Association or RAFA) is the largest single service membership organization and the longest standing registered service charity that provides welfare support to the family of RAF members. Their goal is to "provide friendship, help and support to current and former members of the Royal Air Force and their dependents." It was founded in 1929. 

As of 2018, the RAF Association had a membership of over 74,000 including active duty RAF personnel, veterans and non-service individuals. They have a UK-wide caseworker network of over 540 volunteer welfare caseworkers and over 500 befrienders, they undertake over 85,000 welfare contacts annually. Their help ranges from simply providing conversation and friendship to preparing and submitting application forms for financial assistance.

History

At the end of the First World War, a number of Squadron and Unit Associations were formed to enable those who had served together to maintain contact with one another. In 1919, the women who had served with the Royal Air Force in the First World War formed an Old Comrades Association to which members of the Women's Auxiliary Air Force were admitted. In 1929, in the Sergeants’ Mess at RAF Andover, three men named Vernon Goodhand, Joe Pearce and Warrant Officer Bartlett met to discuss the formation of a single organisation dedicated to the welfare of serving and ex-serving RAF personnel: one which would replace the many smaller organisations that had grown to keep former servicemen in touch since the end of the First World War. The idea was supported by William Coen, editor of  The Planesman, in a series of articles. The inaugural meeting was held on 23 April 1930 at Ye Olde Butler's Head in the City of London where preliminary plans for a national organisation were discussed, with Joe Pearce in the chair. A provisional committee was formed with Air Commodore C R Samson as Chairman, Air Commodore B C H Drew as Vice-Chairman and editor William Coen as Honorary Secretary. The title  "Comrades of the Royal Air Forces" was adopted, and three months later in 1930 a provisional committee had been formed called "Comrades of the Royal Air Forces Association" and the first general meeting of the new organisation took place at the Queen’s Hotel, Leicester Square, London. Air Ministry support for the Comrades came in 1933 when the  Air Council officially recognized the organisation and Hugh Trenchard, 1st Viscount Trenchard accepted the Presidency.

The new Association was to make rapid progress in the early 1930s, although membership was to remain fairly small. Benevolent schemes began, and Christmas hampers were sent to unemployed members in those difficult days. In 1936 George V gave his patronage, and the Association has had Royal Patrons ever since. The size of the RAF remained modest until the effects of the re-armament programme began to be felt in  1938. The strength of the "Comrades" never grew beyond 10,000 in pre-war days.

Following the outbreak of war in 1939, the Women's Auxiliary Air Force reformed, and the Women’s Royal Air Force Old Comrades Association (created in 1919) opened its membership to all ranks of the new female air service. In 1941, the two Old Comrades organisations for airmen and airwomen merged, resulting in a combined membership of nearly 20,000. By 1943, with more than a million serving in the RAF, it became clear that if the Association was to plan an effective part in the post-war era, it would need to be organised. The Association's Committee concluded that its aims and objectives should be extended beyond its original purpose, "to advise and assist all ranks leaving the Royal Air Force in regard to pensions, disability awards, grants, etc... to assist all ranks leaving the Royal Air Force to find suitable employment; to advise and assist all ranks leaving the Royal Air Force upon any business or financial transaction connected with their re-entry into civil life; ... To co-operate with any Government department and/or other Organisations having similar objects to this Association." The Air Council was advised that the Association was considering a change of name, that it desired to obtain a Royal Charter, and that its support of the application would be sought in due course.

In 1943, the name of the organisation was changed to "The Royal Air Forces Association" with membership open to all who were serving or had served in the Royal Air Forces of the Crown. The Association was officially recognised by the Air Ministry. Branches were grouped into Regions. A National Council, under the chairmanship of Air Chief Marshal Sir John Steel was formed to replace the Committee of CRAFA, upon which Regions were represented, was formed and welfare services including legal and general advice, pensions and employment were instituted. The foundations of the charity's present structure were laid in the remaining wartime years, so that when demobilization began in 1945 the Association was able to cope with the situation. Welfare officers , employment officials and legal advisers were appointed both at National Headquarters and at branch level and, at the Air Ministry's invitation, officials went" to Release Centres to tell those being "demobbed" how the Association could help them.

In 1947 membership reached a peak with around 200,000 members and some 565 branches throughout the UK and in some overseas territories. During this time, membership enrolment reached as many as 10,000 a month.

Gerald Boak was appointed to the position of Chief Executive in 1947. Boak did much to organise and lead the Association during a period when there was much uncertainty. That the Association was able to progress through the difficulties of those post-war years, that it was able to develop its Area structure and that its fund-raising potential began to be realised was due particularly to Boak who served the Association so well for nearly 30 years.

In 1948, a policy of decentralisation was agreed whereby the United Kingdom was divided into nine Areas. Six Areas were formed in England and one each in Wales, Scotland and Northern Ireland. Each Area had an Area Headquarters with a paid Director and staff, an Area Council elected by the Branches in the Area and representation on the Council of the Association. Overseas Branches were later formed into three groups for administration purposes. The South African Area has its own Area Council and looks after all Branches in that country. The European Area, comprising all the European Branches, also has an Area Council and is represented on the Council of the Association. Other Overseas Branches are classified as "Independent Overseas Branches". Welfare officers, employment officials and legal advisers were appointed at National Headquarters and at local branch levels. At the Air Ministry's invitation officials attended Release Centers to inform demobilised Air Personnel how the Association could help them.

Following a 1950 Conference decision, a National Wings Day was held the next year and this, the first WingsF1939 Appeal, raised over £26,000. On 20 January 1953, the Association was granted a Royal charter.

In February 1958, the Association's first convalescent and rest home was opened at Lytham St Anne’s, Lancashire. It was named Richard Peck House in honour of Air Marshal Sir Richard Peck, who became President of the RAFA in 1949, succeeding Lord Trenchard and Lord Newall. In 1962 the Association acquired "Sussexdown" in Storrington, Sussex as part of a plan to provide a dual-purpose home in the south of England. Within a couple of years .Sussexdown was to have a Residential Wing as well as providing convalescent facilities.

The difficulties of obtaining suitable housing for elderly, and often disabled members, had long concerned the Association. The Norwest Housing Association completed a project involving the construction of 22 self-contained flats at Bolton in 1976, initiating thereby an important addition to the Association's range of welfare facilities. Later the Central Housing Association was given approval for the construction of 32 double flats on vacant space at Sussexdown. Construction work began in 1978. The next major project to be undertaken was that at Dowding House, Moffat. This scheme was completed in October 1988, and included the creation of a complex of self-contained flats, a communal lounge, conservatory, laundry facilities and a guest room. A care-call system was installed in all the flats and a resident warden appointed.

At the start of the 21st century, the RAF Association underwent a complete reorganisation and the National Headquarters relocated to Leicester. The Association's Areas were amalgamated into five. In 2003 Areas in the UK were merged into: Northern; South East & Eastern; and Wales, Midland & South Western followed by Scotland & Northern Ireland in 2004.

The Association has continued to be at the forefront of providing support to the RAF family. As well as continuing to help those who served in World War II, it has given assistance to vast numbers of Service personnel including veterans of the conflicts in Korea, The Falklands and The Middle East, and those affected by the campaign in Afghanistan and elsewhere. The Association continues to operate a wide network of over 422 branches worldwide, and has a membership of over 61,900. Its Welfare Officers continue to seek out those in welfare need and provide a range of services.

Wings Appeal
The Wings Appeal is the RAF Association's on-going fundraising campaign that runs throughout the year.

The RAF Association's fundraisers come in many forms; including RAF Association Branch members, members of the serving RAF, RAF Cadets, employees of companies who support the Association and individual members of the public.

The types of activity which volunteers undertake include:
 Holding charity collections in town centres, supermarkets and other public venues
 House-to-house collections
 Placing collecting tins in public places
 Holding a "Brew for the Few" tea party
 Manning stalls at public events such as airshows and church fairs
 Sponsored challenge events
 Taking part in the Wings Lotto Grand Draw & Wings Lotto weekly competitions

Welfare
The kind of welfare support provided by the RAF Association is wide-ranging: everything from providing home visits and respite care breaks, to offering advice and, in some circumstances, financial assistance in times of difficulty.

In a typical year, these are some of the ways the RAF Association helps Servicemen and women, past and present.
 Over 74,000 members offering friendship and support
 Supporting over 85,000 beneficiaries in 2018
 Helping to secure more than £550,000 in pension and compensation claims for those facing financial hardship
 Provide much needed respite care breaks for around 2,500 guests in their WIngs Breaks hotels
 The Storybook Wings initiative helps keep families connected for more than 95,000 days by helping a serving parent record a bedtime story
 Through the RAF Families Federation the RAF Association gives RAF personnel and their families the chance to influence future policy
Over 10,000 serving personnel every month log on to the free wifi provision across 43 sites and 82 contact houses keeping the RAF family connected with family and friends
 The RAF Association distributes more than £3.1 million in welfare grants to serving and ex-serving personnel
68 partners have been trained as childminders as a pilot programme at RAF Benson, RAF Waddington, RAF Cranwell, RAF Wittering, RAF Scampton and RAF Coningsby a full extension of this programme is planned in 2019
The RAF Association trains all of its welfare volunteers to a nationally accredited standard. They are using the Short Warwick-Edinburgh Mental Wellbeing Scale (SWEMWS) to measure the impact of their casework. 
Since 2018 the RAF Association have trained and deployed some 500 befrienders who have befriended a wide range of former RAF personnel - almost 25,000 hours of volunteer work in 2018.

Storybook Wings
Storybook Wings enables parents to record bedtime stories, along with personal messages, for their children to listen to while they are away.

The RAF Association provides recording equipment to parents for them to record their chosen stories. Thanks to donations received from members and the general public the association is able to fund the special editing and sound mixing equipment needed by our volunteer editors. Once edited, a soundtrack is added to give each story a really special feel. The completed CD is then sent to the children in a personalised CD cover, and is ready for them to listen to whenever they like.

The RAF Association now supports 35 stations who participate in this project, and RAF personnel are also able to record stories while in Theatre, with two recorders in Afghanistan, plus another at RAF Mount Pleasant in the Falkland Islands.

Wings Breaks
The RAF Association owns and runs three respite care homes situated across the country in some of England's most picturesque locations. These offer respite short stays and breaks.

rafa YOUTH
rafa YOUTH is the RAF Association's youth membership scheme and is aimed at young people aged 13–17.

rafa YOUTH aims to help increase the RAF Association's long term numbers; encourage volunteering, support and increase awareness of the association's purpose as well as helping to promote youth development through air-related activities. It is hoped that youth members will continue their membership of the RAF Association as adults when they turn 18 and move on.

All 13- to 17-year-olds who are in uniform as Air Cadets, CCF (RAF), GVCAC, Air Scouts and Air Explorer Scouts are eligible to join rafa YOUTH.

See also
The Royal British Legion (RBL)
SSAFA
RAF Benevolent Fund (RAFBF)
Royal Air Force (RAF)

Notes

References

External links 
 RAF Association website
 RAF Association Online Book

1943 establishments in the United Kingdom
British veterans' organisations
Charities based in Leicestershire
Leicester
Organizations established in 1943
Royal Air Force